Lord is a surname, and may refer to:
 Lord family, fictional family
 Albert Lord, (1912–1991), Professor of Slavic literature 
 Amnon Lord (born 1952), Israeli journalist
 Andrew Lord (disambiguation)
 Austin W. Lord (1860–1922), American architect
 Ava Lord, fictional character
 Bernard Lord (born 1965), Canadian politician
 Bette Bao Lord (born 1938), Chinese-born American writer 
 Buff Lord (1892–1985), English rugby league footballer
 Charles Lord (1928–1993), United States investment banker
 Chester Sanders Lord (1850–1933), New York journalist
 Cynthia Lord, children's author
 David Lord (disambiguation), multiple people
 Del Lord (1894–1970), film director and actor best known as a director of Three Stooges films
 Dorian Lord, fictional character
 Eda Hurd Lord (1854–1938), American businesswoman
 Edwin Chesley Estes Lord (born 1868), American geologist and petrographer
 Elyse Ashe Lord (1900–1971), British artist
 Frank Lord (1936–2005), English footballer and manager
 Gary Lord (artist) (born 1952), Ohio-based faux painting artist and teacher
 Gary Lord (rugby league) (born 1966), rugby league footballer of the 1980s, 1990s and 2000s (older brother of Paul Lord (rugby league))
 Geoff Lord (born 1945), Australian business man 
 George Lord (1818–1880), Australian politician
 George Edwin Lord (1846–1876), U.S. Army assistant surgeon
 George P. Lord (1831–1917), New York politician
 Herbert Gardiner Lord (1849–1930), American philosopher
 Holyn Lord (born 1973), American tennis player
 Jack Lord (1920–1998), American actor
 James Lord (disambiguation), various
 Jammal Lord (born 1981), American former football quarterback
 Jarvis Lord (1816–1887), New York politician
 Joe Lord (1922–1986), American professional basketball player
 John Lord (disambiguation), various
 Jon Lord (politician) (1956–2014), Canadian politician
 Jon Lord (1941–2012), English composer and pianist (Deep Purple)
 Jonathan Lord (born 1962),British MP
 Jonathan Luke Lord
 Justine Lord (born 1937), English actress
 Kara Lord (born 1988), Miss Guyana Universe 2011
 Karen Lord (born 1968), Barbadian writer
 Marjorie Lord (1918–2015), American actress
 Mary Lou Lord (born 1965), American indie folk musician
 Maxwell Lord, fictional character
 Meredith Lord, fictional character
 Miles Lord (1919–2016), American jurist
 Paul Lord (rugby league) (born 1967), rugby league footballer of the 1980s and 1990s (younger brother of Gary Lord (rugby league))
 Paul Lord (born 1969)
 Phil Lord, film writer and director
 Peter Lord (born 1953), animator
 Rebecca Lord (born 1973), French pornographic actress
 Remember L. H. Lord (1864–1938), American businessman and politician
 Sterling Lord (1922–2022), American literary agent, editor, and author
 Susan Lord, American engineer
 Thomas Lord (1755–1832), English professional cricketer
 Tina Lord, fictional character
 Victor Lord, fictional character
 Victoria Lord, fictional character
 Walter Lord (1917–2002), American writer and historian
 William Lord (disambiguation), various

See also
 Laud
 Lords

English-language surnames